The 1810 Massachusetts gubernatorial election was held on April 2, 1810.

Incumbent Federalist Governor Christopher Gore was defeated by Democratic-Republican nominee Elbridge Gerry.

General election

Candidates
Elbridge Gerry, Democratic-Republican, former U.S. Representative
Christopher Gore, Federalist, incumbent Governor

Results

References

1810
Massachusetts
Gubernatorial